Glen Cowan is a professor of Particle Physics at Royal Holloway, University of London. He has made a considerable contribution to the ATLAS experiment at the Large Hadron Collider.

Education 
Cowan obtained a Bachelor of Science in Physics in 1981 from UCLA. In 1988 he completed his PhD at UC Berkeley where he focused his researched on the TPC/Two-Gamma Experiment.

Career 
Cowan was a postdoctoral researcher from 1988 to 1992 at the Max Planck Institute for Physics in Munich and at the University of Siegen. At both institutes he worked on the ALEPH experiment and Large Electron–Positron Collider at CERN. He joined the Royal Holloway academic staff in 1998.
Cowan writes the statistics chapter of the Particle Data Group

Research 
Cowan is involved with analysing data and developing software for the ATLAS experiment at the LHC. He is also involved in searching for physics beyond the standard model, such as Supersymmetry.

References 

Living people
Academics of Royal Holloway, University of London
21st-century American physicists
Particle physicists
Year of birth missing (living people)
People associated with CERN